C/2008 T2 (Cardinal), is a non-periodic comet. It was discovered by Rob. D. Cardinal from the University of Calgary. It was visible as a telescopic and binocular object during 2009. It passed near the Perseus star clusters NGC 1528 on March 15 and NGC 1545 on March 17, 2009. It also passed near the Auriga star clusters M38 on April 14, M36 on April 17, and M37 in on April 21, 2009, and passed near Comet Lulin on May 12, 2009, for observers on Earth. It peaked in brightness in June–July 2009 at 8.5-9m.

References 

2009 in science
20081001